Cameraria is a genus of moths in the family Gracillariidae, which includes many species of leaf miners. One of the best known species is the horse-chestnut leaf miner, Cameraria ohridella.

Species

Cameraria acericola Kumata, 1963
Cameraria aceriella (Clemens, 1859)
Cameraria aesculisella (Chambers, 1871)
Cameraria affinis (Frey & Boll, 1876)
Cameraria agrifoliella (Braun, 1908)
Cameraria anomala Opler & Davis, 1981
Cameraria arcuella (Braun, 1908)
Cameraria australisella (Chambers, 1878)
Cameraria barlowi Kumata, 1993
Cameraria bauhiniae (Stainton, 1856)
Cameraria bethunella (Chambers, 1871)
Cameraria betulivora (Walsingham, 1891)
Cameraria borneensis Kumata, 1993
Cameraria caryaefoliella (Clemens, 1859)
Cameraria castaneaeella (Chambers, 1875)
Cameraria cervina (Walsingham, 1907)
Cameraria chambersella (Walsingham, 1889)
Cameraria cincinnatiella (Chambers, 1871)
Cameraria conglomeratella (Zeller, 1875)
Cameraria corylisella (Chambers, 1871)
Cameraria diabloensis Opler & Davis, 1981
Cameraria diplodura Bai, 2015
Cameraria eppelsheimii (Frey & Boll, 1878)
Cameraria fara de Prins, 2012
Cameraria fasciata Kumata, 1993
Cameraria fasciella (Walsingham, 1891)
Cameraria fletcherella (Braun, 1908)
Cameraria gaultheriella (Walsingham, 1889)
Cameraria guttifinitella (Clemens, 1859)
Cameraria hamadryadella (Clemens, 1859)
Cameraria hamameliella (Busck, 1903)
Cameraria hexalobina (Vári, 1961)
Cameraria hikosanensis Kumata, 1963
Cameraria jacintoensis Opler & Davis, 1981
Cameraria jiulianshanica Bai, 2015
Cameraria landryi de Prins, 2012
Cameraria lentella (Braun, 1908)
Cameraria leucothorax (Walsingham, 1907)
Cameraria lobatiella Opler & Davis, 1981
Cameraria macrocarpae Freeman, 1970
Cameraria macrocarpella (Frey & Boll, 1878)
Cameraria magnisignata Kumata, 1993
Cameraria marinensis Opler & Davis, 1981
Cameraria mediodorsella (Braun, 1908)
Cameraria mendocinensis Opler & Davis, 1981
Cameraria milletiae Kumata, 1993
Cameraria nemoris (Walsingham, 1889)
Cameraria niphonica Kumata, 1963
Cameraria obliquifascia (Filipjev, 1926)
Cameraria obstrictella (Clemens, 1859)
Cameraria ohridella Deschka & Dimić, 1986
Cameraria ostryarella (Chambers, 1871)
Cameraria palawanensis Kumata, 1995
Cameraria pentekes Opler & Davis, 1981
Cameraria perodeaui de Prins, 2012
Cameraria philippinensis Kumata, 1995
Cameraria picturatella (Braun, 1916)
Cameraria platanoidiella (Braun, 1908)
Cameraria pongamiae Kumata, 1993
Cameraria quadrifasciata Kumata, 1993
Cameraria quercivorella (Chambers, 1879)
Cameraria rhynchophysa Bai, 2015
Cameraria saccharella (Braun, 1908)
Cameraria sadlerianella Opler & Davis, 1981
Cameraria saliciphaga (Kuznetzov, 1975)
Cameraria sempervirensella Opler & Davis, 1981
Cameraria serpentinensis Opler & Davis, 1981
Cameraria shenaniganensis Opler & Davis, 1981
Cameraria sokoke de Prins, 2012
Cameraria superimposita (Braun, 1925)
Cameraria temblorensis Opler & Davis, 1981
Cameraria tildeni Opler & Davis, 1981
Cameraria torridella de Prins, 2012
Cameraria trizosterata Kumata, 1993
Cameraria tubiferella (Clemens, 1860)
Cameraria ulmella (Chambers, 1871)
Cameraria umbellulariae (Walsingham, 1889)
Cameraria varii de Prins, 2012
Cameraria virgulata (Meyrick, 1914)
Cameraria walsinghami Opler & Davis, 1981
Cameraria wislizeniella Opler, 1971
Cameraria zaira de Prins, 2012

External links
C. ohridella Information
Global Taxonomic Database of Gracillariidae (Lepidoptera)

Lithocolletinae
 
Gracillarioidea genera
Taxa named by Thomas Algernon Chapman